Irving Berlin's There's No Business Like Show Business is a 1954 American musical comedy-drama film directed by Walter Lang. It stars an ensemble cast, consisting of Ethel Merman, Donald O'Connor, Marilyn Monroe, Dan Dailey, Johnnie Ray, and Mitzi Gaynor.

The title is borrowed from the famous song in the stage musical (and MGM film) Annie Get Your Gun. The screenplay was written by Phoebe Ephron and Henry Ephron, based on a story by Lamar Trotti;  and the movie was Fox's first musical in CinemaScope and DeLuxe Color.

O'Connor later called the film the best picture he ever made.

Summary

The story opens in 1919 and chronicles the ups and downs in the careers of Terence and Molly Donahue, a husband-and-wife vaudeville team. Throughout the years, the Donahues reconcile a stable family life with professional success. Their children, Steve, Katy, and Tim, join the act one by one, and they eventually become known as The Five Donahues. However, as the children mature, they answer other callings. Steve, for example, enrolls in a Catholic seminary for training as a priest. Later, Tim falls in love with a successful performer, Vicky Parker, and he and sister Katy consent to join her act as supporting players. However, Tim and Vicky experience a falling out, and he abandons the act. Despite efforts by the family to locate him, Tim's whereabouts remain a mystery.

Meanwhile, Katy begins dating Charlie Gibbs, the show's tall and spare lyricist, and they are eventually married—in a ceremony ministered by Steve who has just been ordained a priest. Thus, the Five Donahues are no more, until months later at a benefit on the closing night of the famed Hippodrome Theatre in New York. As Molly sings the film's title song for the sellout crowd, Steve arrives backstage unexpectedly, followed by Tim, in the uniform of a U.S. Sailor. There, he reconciles with Vicky and his family, and for the first time in years, the Five Donahues reunite for the film's elaborate finale.

Cast

Soundtrack
All songs written by Irving Berlin.

Production 
In the months prior to the filming of the movie, Marilyn Monroe had been placed on suspension from 20th Century-Fox after refusing to accept the leading role in a film version of a Broadway musical titled The Girl in Pink Tights. During her suspension, she married baseball star Joe DiMaggio and the two honeymooned in Japan, during which time she entertained American soldiers in Korea. Fox had intended to cast Sheree North in There's No Business Like Show Business, going so far as to screen-test North in Monroe's own studio wardrobe. When Monroe returned to California, her Fox suspension was lifted, and studio executives offered her a role in the ensemble cast of There's No Business Like Show Business as a replacement project for having refused to make Pink Tights. Monroe initially refused to make There's No Business Like Show Business just as she had for the previous project until Fox assured her that her next vehicle would be The Seven Year Itch.  She also demanded a pay increase of $3,000 a week.

Ethel Merman had first sung "There's No Business Like Show Business" in the original Broadway production of Annie Get Your Gun in 1946 and would go on to sing it again in the 1967 television broadcast of the subsequent Lincoln Center revival of that musical comedy.

Release and reception
To publicize the film, Monroe wore a black cotton polka-dot swimsuit. It went on auction at Christie's in London in 1991 and sold for $22,400 to collector David Gainsborough Roberts.

Despite boasting a lavish production, Irving Berlin's There's No Business Like Show Business eventually became both a critical and box office failure.

Ed Sullivan described Monroe's performance of the song "Heat Wave" as "one of the most flagrant violations of good taste" he had witnessed. Time magazine compared her unfavorably to co-star Ethel Merman. Bosley Crowther in The New York Times called the film a "major success" in a generally favorable review, praising in particular Donald O'Connor's performance, but said that Mitzi Gaynor had surpassed Monroe's "wriggling and squirming" which were "embarrassing to behold." Donald O'Connor drew unfavorable reviews for his "over-acting" and "uncanny flirting" with Monroe on-screen. Dan Dailey and Johnnie Ray favored better among critics, although reviewers stated their performances were "below average".

The film's budget was $4,340,000.  Excessive at the time for a movie filmed entirely on a studio lot in Los Angeles, the expenses were mainly due to delays in production, the lavish musical numbers and a running time that was at least 15 minutes longer than most other Hollywood musicals.  Because the film made just $5,103,555 at the North American box office, Musicals at the time did less well overseas and it was estimated it would only earn $2 million outside the US and Canada. 20th Century Fox officials were disappointed.

According to records, Fox was expecting a profit of $2 million, but ran a loss of almost $950,000.   It is also significant that Johnnie Ray never worked again for 20th Century Fox or appeared in another motion picture made by any major movie studio in the United States or another country, though his music developed a stronger following overseas than in the United States.

The film's TV premiere occurred October 28, 1961, on NBC's ground-breaking movie anthology series, Saturday Night at the Movies, in a pan-and-scan version to match the square, small-screen design of televisions manufactured at the time. Later syndicated broadcasts on local television stations were unkind to the legacy of There's No Business Like Show Business because it warranted a time slot of at least two-and-one-half hours, including commercials, and also because of the lack of letterboxing during that era. Every CinemaScope movie lost much of its appeal when shown on television in the 1960s and 1970s, even if it was in black-and-white, but There's No Business Like Show Business was hit especially hard because of cinematographer Leon Shamroy’s placement of at least two members of the ensemble cast on the wide screen in every frame as they hit a lot of marks on the soundstage.  The several dance sequences with at least three cast members were compromised by the pan-and-scan process.

The movie's release to the home video market in the early 1990s solved the problem of commercial interruptions and improved its profits and reputation considerably. The issue of the aspect ratio of CinemaScope remained, however. A DVD release in 2001 included letterboxing and 4-channel surround sound, thereby eliminating the bad aspect ratio and introducing the movie to younger generations. It has received favorable reviews from critics and fans.

Awards and honors

The film is recognized by American Film Institute in these lists:
 2006: AFI's Greatest Movie Musicals – Nominated

References

External links

 
 
 
 
 

1954 films
1954 comedy-drama films
1954 romantic comedy films
1954 romantic drama films
1950s musical comedy-drama films
1950s romantic comedy-drama films
1950s romantic musical films
20th Century Fox films
American musical comedy-drama films
American romantic comedy-drama films
American romantic musical films
Films directed by Walter Lang
Films produced by Sol C. Siegel
Films scored by Alfred Newman
Films scored by Irving Berlin
Films scored by Lionel Newman
Jukebox musical films
CinemaScope films
1950s English-language films
1950s American films